Jorgensen or Joergensen (original spelling: Jørgensen ) is a common Danish-Norwegian patronymic surname meaning "son of Jørgen" (Danish version of the Greek Γεώργιος (geōrgios), cf. English George). Jørgensen is the tenth most common surname in Denmark, shared by about 1.8% of the population. It is also the twenty second most common surname in Norway. Scandinavian immigrants to English-speaking countries often changed the spelling to Jorgensen or Jorgenson in order to accommodate English orthographic rules. Similarly, mass media in English often render Jørgensen as Jorgensen. It may refer to:

List of people with the surname Jorgensen or Jørgensen
Adolf Ditlev Jørgensen (1840-1897), Danish historian
Albert N. Jorgensen (1899–1978), American academic administrator
Andy Jorgensen (born 1967), American politician, Wisconsin State Assembly
Anker Jørgensen (1922-2016), Danish Prime Minister
Ann Eleonora Jørgensen (born 1965), Danish actress
Astrid Jorgensen, New Zealand-Australian vocalist, conductor and composer
Ben Jorgensen, American singer and guitarist
Bill Jorgensen (born 1927), American television anchor
C.V. Jørgensen (born 1950), Danish Rock Musician and songwriter
Charlotte Jørgensen (born 1972), Danish ballroom dancer
Chris Michael Jorgensen (born 1970), USPS Rural Route Carrier
Christine Jorgensen (1926-1989), American transgender woman
Claus Jørgensen (born 1974), Danish race walker
Danny Jorgensen (born 1951), American professor of religious studies
Dan Jørgensen (born 1975), Danish politician
Daniel Jorgensen (disambiguation), several people
Dick Jorgensen (1934-1990), American football official
Ejler Andreas Jorgensen (1838–1876), Danish artist
Ellen Jørgensen (1877–1948), Danish historian
Emil Jørgensen (1882-1947), Danish footballer
Emil Peter Jørgensen (born 1995), Danish footballer
Eric J. Jorgensen, (born 1942), American author, auto and motorcycle books
Erik M. Jorgensen, American biologist
Geir Hansteen Jörgensen (born 1968), Swedish television and film director
Gwen Jorgensen, (born 1986) American professional triathlete
Ian Jorgensen, (born 1896)Professional Football Player 
Ian Jorgensen, New Zealand photographer
Janel Jorgensen (born 1971), American swimmer
Jan Ø. Jørgensen (born 1987), Danish badminton player
Jeffrey Preston Jorgensen (born 1964), American businessman (most widely known as Jeff Bezos), founder, CEO, and president of Amazon.com
Jim Jorgensen (born 1948), American businessman
Jo Jorgensen (born 1957), American politician
Johannes Jorgensen (1866-1956), Danish religious writer
Jørgen Jørgensen (1780-1841), Danish adventurer
Joseph Jorgensen (1844-1888), American politician
Kenneth Jørgensen (born 1976), Danish handballer
Kenneth Jørgensen (curler) (born 1984), Danish curler
Karina Jørgensen (born 1988), Danish badminton player
Lars Jorgensen (born 1970), American educational specialist
Line Jørgensen (born 1989), Danish handball player
Martin Jørgensen (born 1975), Danish football (soccer) player
Mathias Jørgensen (born 1990),  Danish football player, nicknamed Zanka
Mikael Jorgensen (born 1972), American keyboardist for Wilco
Mike Jorgensen (born 1948), American baseball player
Minna Jørgensen (1904-1975), Danish film actress
Nicolai Jørgensen (born 1991), Danish footballer
Nils Jørgensen (1911-1996), Norwegian fencer
Oluf Kavlie-Jørgensen (1902-1984), Norwegian chess player
Paul Jorgensen, South African advocate
Pete Jorgensen (born 1935), American politician
Peter Jörgensen (1870-1937), entomologist
Richard A. Jorgensen (born 1951), American molecular geneticist
Sophus Mads Jørgensen (1837-1914), Danish chemist
Spider Jorgensen (1919-2003), American baseball player
Sven Erik Jørgensen (1934-2016), Danish environmental engineer
Tage Jørgensen (1918-1999), Danish fencer
Tor Berger Jørgensen (born 1945), Norwegian Lutheran bishop
Troels Jørgensen, mathematician
Wagner Jorgensen (1913-1977), American football player
William Kvist Jørgensen (born 1985), Danish football player
William L. Jorgensen (born 1949), American chemist
Wyatt Jorgensen  (born 1994), Professional Snowmobiler

References

Danish-language surnames
Norwegian-language surnames
Patronymic surnames
Surnames from given names